Thomas Mercier (born 8 January 1890, date of death unknown) was a Jamaican cricketer. He played in three first-class matches for the Jamaican cricket team in 1924/25 and 1925/26.

See also
 List of Jamaican representative cricketers

References

External links
 

1890 births
Year of death missing
Jamaican cricketers
Jamaica cricketers
People from Saint Mary Parish, Jamaica